Euphaedra adonina, the golden Themis forester, is a butterfly in the family Nymphalidae. It is found in Nigeria, Cameroon, the Republic of the Congo and the Democratic Republic of the Congo. The habitat consists of forests.

Subspecies
Euphaedra adonina adonina (Nigeria, western Cameroon)
Euphaedra adonina prasina Hecq, 1991 (southern Cameroon)
Euphaedra adonina spectacularis Hecq, 1997 (Cameroon, Congo, Democratic Republic of the Congo)

Similar species
Other members of themis species group q.v.

References

Butterflies described in 1865
adonina
Butterflies of Africa
Taxa named by William Chapman Hewitson